Limia is a genus of livebearing fishes belonging to the Cyprinodontiform family Poeciliidae, which includes other livebearers such as platys, swordtails (genus Xiphophorous), guppies and mollies (genus Poecilia). They are found in fresh and brackish water. Of the 21 described Limia species, 17 are endemic to Hispaniola, one is found on both Hispaniola and Jamaica, and the Cayman Islands, Cuba, and Venezuela have an endemic species each. Limia are popular in aquaria among more advanced hobbyists.

Origin and evolution 
Two schools of thought on the origin of the genus exist. The first suggests that Limia arose from colonization by a seawater-tolerant species that crossed over shallow waters from the North or South American mainland. The strongest evidence for this model is that of the approximately 60 species of freshwater fish in the Antilles, all of them are secondary division freshwater fish. This indicates the ancestors of all fish present on the islands at least had the ability to cross over shallow seas.

The second school of thought suggests freshwater fish in the Antilles are the descendants of mainland species that became isolated when some of the Greater Antilles split from the mainland. The virtual lack of freshwater fish fossils from the Antilles means this debate likely needs to be resolved through molecular evidence.

Some authorities regard the genus Limia as a synonym of Poecilia, albeit as a valid subgenus.

Mating system 
Fish in the genus Limia are lecithotrophic, meaning that there is pre-fertilization maternal provisioning in the form of yolked eggs. The female gives birth to live young, which have a higher chance of survival than eggs and earlier stage fry. Fertilization is achieved internally with the male's gonopodium, a modified anal fin used for sperm transfer. Because of the asymmetrical energy costs associated with internal fertilization, females in many Poeciliid species act as the choosy sex, with males exhibiting ornate coloration and morphology as well as elaborate courtship displays. However, Limia mostly lack display or extreme sexual dimorphism/dichromism. Of the known species, only the humpback limia (L. nigrofasciata), Perugia's limia (L. Perugiae) and the blackbelly or Jamaican limia (L. melanogaster) have been found to exhibit male courtship displays.
The majority of limia species rely on forced copulation, in which the male thrusts his gonopodium into the female's genital pore without a prior display. The consequence of this system of mating can be the undermining of female choice, halting the progression of sexual selection on male traits and in some cases inhibiting speciation.

Hybrids 
Fertile hybrids have been obtained between L. melanogaster and both L. nigrofasciata and L. vittata.

John Dawes in the UK, in his book Livebearing Fishes, reported a L. melanogaster x L. nigrofasciata hybrid male has been mated to female green sailfin molly. Two hybrid fry were obtained, one was raised to maturity, ending up as a molly-like fish swimming with its head up at an angle of 45 degrees and was unable to maintain an even keel. This hybrid fails to inseminate molly females provided and no further hybrid offspring resulted.

Species
There are currently 23 recognized species in this genus:
 Limia caymanensis Rivas & W. L. Fink, 1970 (Grand Cayman limia)
 Limia dominicensis (Valenciennes, 1846) (Tiburon Peninsula limia)
 Limia fuscomaculata Rivas, 1980 (Blotched limia)
 Limia garnieri Rivas, 1980 (Garnier's limia)
 Limia grossidens Rivas, 1980 (Largetooth limia)
 Limia heterandria Regan, 1913
 Limia immaculata Rivas, 1980 (Plain limia)
 Limia islai, Rodriguez-Silva & Weaver, 2020 (Tiger limia)
Limia mandibularis 
 Limia melanogaster (Günther, 1866) (Blackbelly limia)
 Limia melanonotata Nichols & G. S. Myers, 1923 (Blackbanded limia)
 Limia miragoanensis Rivas, 1980 (Miragoane limia)
 Limia nigrofasciata Regan, 1913 (Black-barred limia)
 Limia ornata Regan, 1913 (Ornate limia)
 Limia pauciradiata Rivas, 1980 (Few-rayed limia)
 Limia perugiae (Evermann & H. W. Clark, 1906) (Perugia's limia)
 Limia rivasi L. R. Franz & G. H. Burgess, 1983 (Rivas's limia)
 Limia sulphurophila Rivas, 1980 (Sulfur limia)
 Limia tridens (Hilgendorf, 1889)
 Limia versicolor (Günther, 1866) (Varicolored limia)
 Limia vittata (Guichenot, 1853) (Cuban limia)
 Limia yaguajali Rivas, 1980 (Yaguajal limia)
 Limia zonata (Nichols, 1915) (Striped limia)

See also
 Lake Miragoâne – lake in Haiti with at least 9 endemic Limia species

References

 
Poeciliidae
Freshwater fish genera
Taxa named by Felipe Poey
Ray-finned fish genera